The 2001 NCAA Division I softball tournament was the twentieth annual tournament to determine the national champion of NCAA women's collegiate softball. Held during May 2001, forty-eight Division I college softball teams contested the championship. The tournament featured eight regionals of six teams, each in a double elimination format. The 2001 Women's College World Series was held in Oklahoma City, Oklahoma from May 24 through May 28 and marked the conclusion of the 2001 NCAA Division I softball season.  Arizona won their sixth NCAA championship by defeating UCLA 1–0 in the final game.  Arizona pitcher Jennie Finch was named Women's College World Series Most Outstanding Player.

Qualifying

Regionals

Regional No. 1
Opening Round
Arizona defeated , 4–2
 defeated , 1–0
 defeated , 2–1

Loser's Bracket
Texas Tech defeated Saint Peter's, 3–2.  Saint Peter's eliminated.
Texas Tech defeated Hawaii, 4–2.  Hawaii eliminated.

Semifinals and Finals
Cal State Fullerton defeated Texas State, 10–1 (5 innings).
Arizona defeated Texas Tech, 8–0 (6 innings).  Texas Tech eliminated
Arizona defeated Texas State, 6–2.
Texas State defeated Cal State Fullerton, 4–3.
Arizona defeated Cal State Fullerton, 5–4.

Arizona advances to WCWS.

Regional No. 2
Opening Round
UCLA defeated , 8–0 (5 innings).
 defeated , 3–1 (9 innings).
 defeated , 2–0.

Loser's Bracket
Fresno State defeated Coastal Carolina, 6–4.  Coastal Carolina eliminated.
Cal State Northridge defeated Fresno State, 3–1.  Fresno State eliminated.

Semifinals and Finals
San Diego State defeated Wisconsin, 1–0.
UCLA defeated Cal State Northridge, 9–0.  Cal State Northridge eliminated.
UCLA defeated San Diego State, 3–1.
San Diego State defeated Wisconsin, 6–1.  Wisconsin eliminated.
UCLA defeated San Diego State, 11–0 (5 innings).

UCLA advances to WCWS.

Regional No. 3
Opening Round
 defeated , 8–0 (6 innings).
 defeated , 4–1.
 defeated , 5–1.

Loser's Bracket
Penn State defeated Cornell, 5–0.  Cornell eliminated.
Penn State defeated Southern Miss, 1–0.  Southern Miss eliminated.

Semifinals and Finals
Arizona State defeated Louisiana–Lafayette, 2–1.
LSU defeated Penn State, 2–1.  Penn State eliminated.
LSU defeated Arizona State, 3–2.
Louisiana–Lafayette defeated Arizona State, 5–0.  Arizona State eliminated.
LSU defeated Louisiana–Lafayette, 2–1.

LSU advances to WCWS.

Regional No. 4
Opening Round
 defeated , 8–2.
 defeated , 1–0.
 defeated , 2–1.

Loser's Bracket
Chattanooga defeated UIC, 5–2.  UIC eliminated.
Oregon State defeated Chattanooga, 13–0 (5 innings).  Chattanooga eliminated.

Semifinals and Finals
Michigan defeated South Florida, 6–2 (13 innings).
Alabama defeated Oregon State, 1–0.  Oregon State eliminated.
Michigan defeated Alabama, 3–2.
South Florida defeated Alabama, 3–2.  Alabama eliminated.
Michigan defeated South Florida, 12–5.

Michigan advances to WCWS.

Regional No. 5
Opening Round
 defeated , 9–2.
 defeated , 6–0.
 defeated , 4–2.

Loser's Bracket
Lehigh defeated Seton Hall, 2–0.  Seton Hall eliminated.
North Carolina defeated Lehigh, 4–0.  Lehigh eliminated.

Semifinals and Finals
Washington defeated UMass, 8–0 (5 innings).
Oklahoma defeated North Carolina, 13–0 (5 innings).  North Carolina eliminated.
Oklahoma defeated Washington, 3–2.
Washington defeated UMass, 7–1.  UMass eliminated.
Oklahoma defeated Washington, 10–2.

Oklahoma advances to WCWS.

Regional No. 6
Opening Round
 defeated , 3–1.
 defeated , 8–0 (6 innings).
 defeated , 4–0.

Loser's Bracket
Hofstra defeated BYU, 4–2.  BYU eliminated.
Central Michigan defeated Hofstra, 10–0 (5 innings).  Hofstra eliminated.

Semifinals and Finals
Nebraska defeated Pacific, 2–1 (8 innings).
Stanford defeated Central Michigan, 6–0.  Central Michigan eliminated.
Stanford defeated Nebraska, 5–1.
Pacific defeated Nebraska, 3–1.  Nebraska eliminated.
Pacific defeated Stanford, 2–0.
Stanford defeated Pacific, 9–1 (5 innings).

Stanford advances to WCWS.

Regional No. 7
Opening Round
 defeated , 8–0 (5 innings).
 defeated , 2–1.
 defeated , 3–2 (9 innings).

Loser's Bracket
Illinois State defeated Western Illinois, 4–0.  Western Illinois eliminated.
Illinois State defeated South Carolina, 1–0.  South Carolina eliminated.

Semifinals and Finals
Iowa defeated DePaul, 7–4.
Notre Dame defeated Illinois State, 2–1.  Illinois State eliminated.
Iowa defeated Notre Dame, 6–0.
Notre Dame defeated DePaul, 8–1.  DePaul eliminated.
Iowa defeated Notre Dame, 6–2.

Iowa advances to WCWS.

Regional No. 8
Opening Round
 defeated , 6–2.
 defeated , 2–0.
 defeated Florida, 3–0.

Loser's Bracket
Connecticut defeated Bethune–Cookman, 2–1.  Bethune–Cookman eliminated.
Florida defeated Connecticut, 8–0 (5 innings).  Connecticut eliminated.

Semifinals and Finals
California defeated Florida Atlantic, 2–0.
Florida State defeated Florida, 6–2.  Florida eliminated.
California defeated Florida State, 1–0.
Florida State defeated Florida Atlantic, 2–0.  Florida Atlantic eliminated.
Florida State defeated California, 2–1.
California defeated Florida State, 3–2 (10 innings).

California advances to WCWS.

Women's College World Series

Participants

*: Excludes UCLA's vacated 1995 WCWS participation.
†: Excludes results of the pre-NCAA Women's College World Series of 1969 through 1981.

Results

Bracket

Game results

Championship game

All-Tournament Team
The following players were members of the All-Tournament Team:

References

2001 NCAA Division I softball season
NCAA Division I softball tournament